The Harvey Islands are two islands in the west part of Freeth Bay, Enderby Land, Antarctica. They were plotted from air photos taken from Australian National Antarctic Research Expeditions aircraft in 1956, and named by the Antarctic Names Committee of Australia for Ross Harvey, a radio officer at Wilkes Station in 1959.

See also 
 List of Antarctic and sub-Antarctic islands

References

Islands of Enderby Land